Epacternis mabokealis is a species of snout moth in the genus Epacternis. It was described by Patrice J.A. Leraut in 2011 and is found in the Central African Republic.

References

Moths described in 2011
Pyralinae